Mañana puedo morir is a 1979 Argentine television miniseries.

Cast

External links
 

1979 television films
Argentine television miniseries
1970s Argentine television series